The Ikki Kajiwara Memorial Show was a Japanese professional wrestling event held in 1988, and again in 1997, in memory of author and manga writer Ikki Kajiwara. Although Kajiwara was not directly connected to puroresu wrestling, he is credited with having created the Tiger Mask character, which has been a popular masked wrestler portrayed by four different Japanese wrestlers in All-Japan Pro Wrestling and New Japan Pro-Wrestling since the early 1980s.

The original show was held at Budokan Hall in Tokyo, Japan on April 2, 1988, and featured wrestlers from All-Japan Pro Wrestling, New Japan Pro-Wrestling and the joshi wrestling promotion Japan Women's Pro Wrestling as well as boxing, judo, karate and shoot fighting exhibition matches. The main event featured Tiger Mask II and Giant Baba defeating Abdullah the Butcher and George Skaaland in a tag team match. On the undercard, Masa Fuchi successfully defended the PWF Junior Heavyweight Championship against Kenta Kobashi.

A second show was held nine years later and held at Tokyo's Sumo Hall on October 12, 1997, attended by 4,000 fans. Like the 1988 show, this was also held as an interpromotional event and had involvement from several major wrestling promotion in Japan at the time. These included, aside from AJPW and NJPW, Kitao Dojo, Ladies Legend Pro-Wrestling, Michinoku Pro, Professional Wrestling Fujiwara Gumi and Wrestle Association R. In the semi-main events, Team WAR (Genichiro Tenryu & Arashi) defeated Team Kitao Dojo (Koji Kitao & Maasaki Mochizuki) while PWFG's Yoshiaki Fujiwara and Super Tiger, NJPW's original Tiger Mask, fought to a no-contest with Antonio Inoki as the special guest referee. On the undercard, Tiger Mask I & Tiger Mask IV faced Tiger Mask II & Tiger Mask III in a tag team match which ended when Tiger Mask I pinned Tiger Mask III. Mitsuharu Misawa, the actual wrestler who portrayed Tiger Mask II, was unable to attend the event and Yoshinobu Kanemaru wrestled in his place. The match was officiated by Michinoku Pro's The Great Sasuke as a special guest referee.

Show results

1997 Ikki Kajiwara Memorial Show
October 12, 1997 in Tokyo, Japan (Sumo Hall)

1988 Ikki Kajiwara Memorial Show
April 2, 1988 in Tokyo, Japan (Budokan Hall)

References

1997 in professional wrestling
1998 in professional wrestling
Professional wrestling memorial shows
Professional wrestling in Tokyo